Willie James Drewrey (born April 28, 1963) is a former professional American football player who played wide receiver for nine seasons for the Houston Oilers and Tampa Bay Buccaneers. 

Drewrey played high school football at Northern Burlington County Regional High School. After graduating high school, Drewrey was an electrifying player for the Mountaineers in the early 80s. He was an ace in the return game and a consistent slot receiver. Drewrey found his niche on special teams at the end of his freshman season. Coach Don Nehlen realized he had to get Willie more touches, giving him increased playing time at wide receiver as his career progressed. Drewrey had a monster senior campaign, ranking 3rd in punt returns, 10th in punt return yardage, and 20th in all-purpose yards. He would be named 1st team All-America that year. In all, Drewrey collected 3,508 career all-purpose yards and 9 touchdowns. He still holds the school record for career punt return yardage 1,191. His special teams capabilities earned him a spot in the NFL for 9 seasons with the Buccaneers (in their creamsicle uniforms) and the Oilers (now the Titans).

References

http://wvu100countdown.blogspot.com/2012/07/48-willie-drewrey.html?m=1

1963 births
Living people
People from Mansfield Township, Burlington County, New Jersey
American football wide receivers
West Virginia Mountaineers football players
Houston Oilers players
Tampa Bay Buccaneers players